Events from the year 1981 in Denmark.

Incumbents
 Monarch – Margrethe II
 Prime minister – Anker Jørgensen

Events

8 December – The 1981 Danish parliamentary election is held.

Sports

Badminton
 Gentofte BK wins Europe Cup.

Cycling
 Albert Fritz (FRG) and Patrick Sercu (BEL) win the Six Days of Copenhagen sox-day track cycling race.

Births
 9 February – Kristian Pless, tennis player
 30 May – Lars Møller Madsen, handball player
 9 June – Kasper Søndergaard, handball player
 1 August – Hans Lindberg, handball player
 1 September – Michael Maze, table tennis player
 6 September – Søren Larsen, footballer
 6 October – Thomas Troelsen, music producer

Deaths
 17 February – Ellen Gottschalch, actress (born 1894)
 27 March – Preben Kaas (born 1930)
 21 November – Ejner Federspiel, actor (born 1896)
 28 November – Arthur Jensen, actor (born 1897)

See also
1981 in Danish television

References

 
Denmark
Years of the 20th century in Denmark
1980s in Denmark